Whatchamacallit is a chocolate candy bar marketed in the United States by The Hershey Company.

History
Whatchamacallit bars were first introduced in 1978. The name was devised by Patricia Volk, the writer of STUFFED: Adventures of a Restaurant Family, when she was the associate creative director at Doyle Dane & Bernbach, and was in charge of new brands on the Hershey account. From 1978 to 1987, Whatchamacallit consisted of a bar of peanut-flavored crisp that utilized peanut butter as the flavoring agent, coated in a thin layer of chocolate. From 1987 to 2008, Whatchamacallit has included peanut-flavored crisp that utilizes peanut butter as the flavoring agent, with a layer of caramel and a layer of chocolate coating. Hershey's Whatchamacallit is found in recipes for various food items, including pies, cookies, cheesecakes, and cupcakes.

The advertising for the Whatchamacallit peaked in the 1980s; after this period Hershey Company ran noticeably fewer advertisements for this product. However, despite the lack of attention the company gives it compared to its other products, the Whatchamacallit is still in production as of 2022.

In Canada, an identical candy bar is marketed by Hershey's as Special Crisp, but does not have the wide distribution in Canada that the Whatchamacallit has in the United States.

Ingredient changes 
In 2008 the Hershey Company began to change the ingredients for some of its products, replacing the relatively expensive cocoa butter with cheaper oil substitutes. Such cost-cutting was done to reduce production costs and avoid price increases for its products.

Hershey's changed the description of the product and altered the packaging slightly along with the ingredients. Though the new formula still contains chocolate, according to United States Food and Drug Administration food labeling laws, products that do not contain cocoa butter cannot legally be described as milk chocolate; instead, such products are often referred to as chocolate candy.

Thingamajig 

In 2009 Hershey's introduced Thingamajig, featuring chocolate, cocoa crisps, and peanut butter inside. It was reintroduced in late 2011 on a supposedly permanent basis. However, as of 2012, according to Hershey's Chocolate World in Pennsylvania, the Thingamajig candy bar is no longer being produced.

Whozeewhatzit 
In 2021 Hershey's unveiled the Whozeewhatzit bar featuring the chocolate, cocoa crisps, crisped rice, and peanut butter ingredients of the Thingamajig bar from 2009. Hershey's held a naming contest for the new bar, with a $5,000 prize for the most creative name, along with a year's supply of the confection. After more than 43,000 entries the Whatchamacallit brand declared the name Whozeewhatzit the winning entry. The Whozeewhatzit wrapper identifies the contest winner: Lisa M. from Framingham, Massachusetts.

See also 

 Wotsits

References

External links

 

 

Products introduced in 1978
Chocolate bars
The Hershey Company brands
Kosher food
Brand name confectionery
Peanut butter confectionery